Lachey is a surname. Notable people with the name include:

Drew Lachey (born 1976), American singer and actor, the brother of Nick Lachey
Jim Lachey (born 1963), American radio analyst for college football and former National Football League player
Matt Lachey or Matt Striker (born 1977), American professional wrestler and wrestling commentator
Nick Lachey (born 1973), American singer-songwriter, actor, producer, and television personality
Vanessa Lachey (born 1980), American television personality and beauty queen